The Colonial Theatre Complex is a group of historic buildings in Laconia, New Hampshire. There are three sections to the complex: the Piscopo Block, Colonial Theatre, and Canal Street Annex. The Piscopo Block, which contains the main entrance to the theatre, is distinguished by a large marquee spelling out "COLONIAL" that is located on Main Street (New Hampshire Route 106). The complex was built in 1914, and was added to the National Register of Historic Places in 2020.


See also
National Register of Historic Places listings in Belknap County, New Hampshire

References

Further reading

External links
 609 Main Street Colonial Theatre Block Redevelopment website

Commercial buildings on the National Register of Historic Places in New Hampshire
Buildings and structures in Laconia, New Hampshire
National Register of Historic Places in Belknap County, New Hampshire
Theatres completed in 1914
1914 establishments in New Hampshire